Ingólfur Jónsson (born 17 October 1952) is an Icelandic cross-country skier. He competed in the men's 15 kilometre event at the 1980 Winter Olympics.

References

1952 births
Living people
Icelandic male cross-country skiers
Olympic cross-country skiers of Iceland
Cross-country skiers at the 1980 Winter Olympics
Place of birth missing (living people)
20th-century Icelandic people